The Society Game (소사이어티 게임) is a South Korean reality TV series, and it was marketed as one of tvN's 10th Anniversary Special Global Project shows. Society Game is a mock society game show in a controlled village environment. 22 contestants compete against each other by staying in the village for a period of 14 days. If the contestants successfully complete the challenges given to them and survive until the end, the reward of a 150 million won (approximately US$150,000) would be given to them.

The Society Game is produced in collaboration with Endemol Shine Group, creators of Big Brother and MasterChef.

Broadcasting time

Broadcast

Contestants
 Chae Ji-won (student, 21, POSTECH Industrial & Management Systems Engineering student)
 Choi Seol-hwa (ballet teacher and trainer, 24, Kyung Hee University Dance graduate)
 Hong Sa-hyuk (doctor and rapper, 30, Seoul National University Medical School PhD student)
 Hwang In-sun (singer, 30, Sungkyunkwan University Dance graduate / Sungkyunkwan University Dance Masters graduate)
 Hyun Kyung-ryul (startup director, 32, Seoul National University Computer Science PhD)
 Jang Han-byul (singer, 27, University of Queensland Dentistry dropout)
 Jung In-jik (student, 26, Seoul National University Physical Education student)
 Kim Hee-jun (English lecturer, 30, University of Illinois at Urbana–Champaign Sports Management graduate / Seoul University Sports Management Masters graduate)
 Kwon A-sol (mixed martial artist, 31, Ritsumeikan Asia Pacific University Management dropout)
 Lee Byung-kwan (Steven Lee, businessman, 29, University of California, Riverside Management Graduate / Yonsei University Management Masters Graduate)
 Lee Hae-sung (student, 25, Seoul National University Management student)
 Lim Dong-hwan (phone developer, 30, Yonsei University Mechanical Engineering graduate)
 MJ Kim (mixed martial artist, 26)
 Oliver Jang (model, 26, Johns Hopkins University Public Health Studies graduate)
 Park Ha-el (student, 24, Korea University International Affairs student)
 Park Seo-hyun (student, 22, Yonsei University Music Composition student)
 Pharoh (rapper, 32, Kyonggi University Sports Management graduate)
 Shin Jae-hyuk (model, 23, Taking time off Seoul Culture Arts University Modeling Degree)
 Yang Ji-an (party planner, 29, Yonsei University Clothing & Textiles / Journalism graduate)
 Yang Sang-guk (comedian, 34)
 Yoon Macho (magazine editor, 30, Seoul Mode Fashion Institute Business graduate)
 Yoon Tae-jin (announcer, 30, Ewha Womans University Dance graduate)

Rules 
Society Game is a game show in which 22 contestants live in a custom-built "house" (an outdoor set) under constant video surveillance for 14 days. While in the house, the contestants are isolated from the outside world. Before the game begins, the contestants are first divided equally into two societies: Nop-dong (Green Team) and Ma-dong (Red Team). The two societies then live apart in two different areas in the house and are isolated from each other at all times besides the Team Challenge and Eviction Ceremony.

The "house" is circular in shape and is divided into three equal sections: Nop-Dong, Ma-Dong, and Neutral Zone. Neutral Zone is the connecting space between the two societies and the main entrance. This is also where Team Challenges and Eviction Ceremonies are held. The two living spaces for both teams are almost identical. Both have a Leader's bedroom, Storage, Cooking Area, Jail, and Bedroom. The Leader's Bedroom is the only air-conditioned room and the air-condition will be deactivated if anyone other the Leader enters the room. The only difference in both spaces is that in Ma-dong, there is a "Rebellion Room" and in Nop-dong, there is a "Voting Room". The "Rebellion Room" contains a gong in which a rebellion can be started and the "Voting Room" is where the contestants conduct a private vote.

Each day, the two societies compete against each other in the Team Challenge. The winning team will be awarded 10,000,000 won (approximately US$10,000) along with other rewards while the losing team will eliminate one member from their team and from the game during the Eviction Ceremony. At Eviction Ceremony, the winning team's Leader has the power to name a Blacklist Candidate. If one member's name is written twice, they are automatically evicted from the game.

At the end of two weeks, only three members from each society will remain and they will compete in the Final Challenge. If only 3 members remain in a society before the end of two weeks, there will be no more evictions from the team even if they lose the Team Challenge. However, if 4 or more members remain in a society by the end of two weeks, the final Leader will have to choose 2 members to join him/her to the Final Challenge while the unselected members will be evicted. The 3 members on the winning team of the Final Challenge will be crowned the winners.

Each society will also choose a Leader. The Leaders will enjoy luxuries including a personal air-conditioned bedroom and access to a personal safe. They also have the power to evict and the power to distribute monetary awards (i.e. prize money won in team challenges).

In Nop-dong (Green Team), the society is modeled as a democracy with all members having the right to vote and the right to be elected. At the beginning of each day, the members will elect a Leader through a secret ballot and the person with the most votes will become the Leader for the day. A maximum of three members can run for candidacy each election and the sitting Leader will automatically become a candidate for the next election. In the case of a tie in the votes, the sitting Leader will break the tie.

In Ma-dong (Red Team), the society is modeled as a totalitarian state with the Leader reigning indefinitely until he/she is "overthrown" in a "rebellion". The initial Leader is chosen through a challenge. However, subsequent Leaders are chosen after a successful "rebellion". At the beginning of their tenures as Leader, the Ma-dong leader must hand out 2 "Keys of Rebellion" to 2 members. Only the keyholders have the power to initiate a rebellion by sounding the gong in the Rebellion Room. If a majority of the members hits the gong within 30 minutes of the initial gong, the "rebellion" is successful. The current Leader will then be "overthrown" and replaced by the person who initiated the "rebellion".

Rule Changes in Season 2
The following rule changes were made in season 2.

 Nop-dong Evictions would now be determined by a vote among all members of Nop-dong. In the event of a tie, the leader would cast a tie-breaker vote. The leader will have immunity from eviction.
 In the event of an unsuccessful rebellion in Ma-dong, the initiator will be blacklisted. This means that if their name has already been put on the blacklist, they will be evicted.

Team Challenges

Episode One - Human Janggi (Human Chess)

Team Prize: 10,000,000 Korean won + additional 5 kg of personal belongings for team

Human Janggi (or Human Chess) is played on an 8-by-6 board which is divided into three levels. Each team has a set of 11 chess pieces numbered from 1 to 11. Each team then assigns a member who is in charge of moving their team's pieces. The remaining 10 members will each be assigned a number corresponding to their numbered chess pieces. The final, unchosen number will become the King. Each piece's identity is concealed at the beginning of the game. The first team that gets their King to opposite side of the board or reveals the opponent's King will win the Challenge.

On each team's turn, they can select one piece and move the piece for:
1) one or two spaces on the same floor, or 
2) one space when moving up or down a floor. 
When a piece moves up to an opponent's piece, the two pieces and their corresponding members are revealed. The two members then engage in a mini-game with the loser's piece eliminated from the board. The King has no defense ability, and once revealed, the King is eliminated. However, a piece cannot attack an opponent piece on a different floor.

There are three mini-games available: Physical, Mental, and Dexterity. The Physical Game (Statue Dropping) is where two players wrestle each other while tied to a mini-statue. The first to knock off their opponent's statue wins. The Mental Game is where two players solving a puzzle using the provided hints. The Dexterity Game is where two players face-off in a Ring Toss game.

The mini-game played is determined by combining the corresponding number of the two members facing off. If the sum of the numbers are:
10 or below = Mental Game
11 to 13 = Dexterity Game
14 or above = Physical Game

 – Match Winner
Bolded - Attacking Team

Mini-Game

A representative from each society competes in a trial run of the Team Challenge. The winning team will be awarded a chest containing a special prize.

Special Prize: Ice and Watermelon

Winning Team:  Ma-dong 

Episode Two - Round Table of Suffering

Team Prize: 10,000,000 Korean won + Ice Cream

Round Table of Suffering is a game that requires both physical and mental capabilities. Each team will designate three members on their team as the "table lifters" and their role is to lift up and hold an 80 kg platform with eggs placed beneath the platform. The remaining members will be participating in a mental math challenge; table lifters will not participate in the challenge.

In the mental math challenge portion, each member will be provided a 6-sided die with numbers 1 to 6 labeled on each face. In each round, an arithmetic equation (i.e. 1 + 1) with a final solution of either 1,2,3,4,5 or 6 will be shown on the screen. A 3-second countdown will ensue in which all participating members will answer the equation by showing the correct face on the dice away from them. If a member answers incorrectly, or if a member fails to lock in an answer in time, it will be deemed as an incorrect answer.

For every incorrect answer by a member in the mental math challenge, a 5 kg bag will be placed on the platform of their corresponding team and increase the total weight carried by the table lifters. The first team to drop their platform and crush the eggs beneath will lose.

OT = Answered over time limit
WA = Presented wrong answer

Mini-Game

A representative from each society competes in a sudden death match of mental challenge portion of the Team Challenge. The winning team will be awarded a chest containing a special prize.

Special Prize: Cooking Oil

Winning Team:  Ma-dong 

Episode Three - Five-Legged Race

Team Prize: 10,000,000 Korean won + Fresh Fruits (Peaches and Grapes)

Each team will send out 4 members, each assigned a number from 1 to 4, every round to compete head-to-head in a relay. 4 straps will be used to strap the left leg of one member to the right leg of another runner. There are also two stations, one located on each end of a 10 m path. On one end, the station is a ring toss challenge and on the other end, the station is a Tangram challenge.

The team will start by running 10 m from one end of the raceway to the other with a cap on the first member's head. The first member will then solve a Tangram puzzle presented at the station. After completing the puzzle, he/she will raise a flag signaling completion, if successful, the first member will pass the cap to the second member and the team will run down the 10 m path back to reach the second station. The second member will then engage in a ring toss. After one successful toss, the cap will be passed to the third member and they will run back to the first station to complete a second Tangram puzzle. After completion, the cap will be passed to the fourth and final member, in which they will run back to the second station. After the final member makes a successful throw, the team completes the relay. The fastest team to successfully complete the relay will win the round.

The Team Challenge will be determined in a best of 3 rounds and the first team to win 2 rounds will win the challenge.

Mini-Game

A representative from each society competes in a head-to-head Tangram puzzle challenge. The winning team will be awarded a chest containing a special prize.

Special Prize: Chili Paste

Winning Team:  Ma-dong 

Episode Four - Floor Removal

Team Prize: 10,000,000 Korean won + Ice Coffee & Ice Cream Cake

Each society starts off with 100 square blocks and 6 people will be chosen to stand on each society's blocks. The remaining residents have to look at the number board on the screen and find multiplication equations.

The numbers are shown in a 5 by 5 matrix table. The equations can be formed using numbers that go left to right, right to left, top to bottom, bottom to top, and diagonally, but the order of the numbers may not be changed. Each team will stand in alternating positions, and each player will be given 10 seconds to find a multiplication equation and answer.

If answered incorrectly or not answered within the time limit, the answer is marked incorrect. If one player answers correctly twice in one round, the round will end. When a round ends, a block will be removed for each society's incorrect answers. The quizzes and floor removal will continue until a team is no longer able to stand on the shrinking floor. If a part of a someone's body touches the ground, their society will lose and the game will end.

Winning Team:  Nop-dong 

Mini-Game

The winning team will be awarded a chest containing a special prize.

Special Prize: Tennis balls + Targets (Aid for future challenges)

Winning Team:  Nop-dong 

Episode Five - Number Climbing

Team Prize: 10,000,000 Korean won + Kimchi

Winning Team:  Nop-dong 

Mini-Game

The winning team will be awarded a chest containing a special prize.

Special Prize: ???

Episode Six - Foul Ball

Team Prize: 10,000,000 Korean won + Ramen

Winning Team:  Nop-dong 

Mini-Game

The winning team will be awarded a chest containing a special prize.

Special Prize: ???

Episode Seven - Indomitable  Runner

Team Prize: 10,000,000 Korean won + Mini Fridge

Each team will select 3 runners to run on the treadmills. The remaining members will participate in hitting targets. Whenever a team knocks down a target, they may choose one of the opposing team's treadmills to speed up.

There are a total of 7 speed settings for the treadmills (8 km/h, 10 km/h, 12 km/h, 13 km/h, 14 km/h, 15 km/h, 16 km/h). After both societies throw their balls and choose a treadmill to speed up, the speeds will be increased simultaneously. The game continues like this until all three runners on a team are eliminated, resulting in that team's loss.

Winner:  Nop-dong 

Mini-Game

A representative from each society competes to be the first to knock down 4 targets in a line. The winning team will be awarded a chest containing a special prize.

Special Prize: Dice (Aid for future challenges)

Winning Team:  Nop-dong 

Episode Eight - Lumberjack

Team Prize: 10,000,000 Korean won + ???

Winning Team:  Ma-dong 

Mini-Game

The winning team will be awarded a chest containing a special prize.

Special Prize: ???

Episodes

Result chart
Prize money was distributed in units of one million won (₩1M). Team challenges initially earned the winning team ₩10M, distributed by the team leader per their wishes. Later challenges increased the prize to ₩15M (as on Day 10), ₩20M (as on Days 12 and 13).

 Color key
 – Nop-dong
 – Ma-dong

Notes

Ratings 
In the ratings below, the highest rating for the show will be in red, and the lowest rating for the show will be in blue.

External links

 Episode Recaps
 http://www.koreanvarietyrecaps.com/society-game-recap-episode-1/
 http://www.koreanvarietyrecaps.com/society-game-recap-episode-2/
 http://www.koreanvarietyrecaps.com/society-game-recap-episode-3/
 http://www.koreanvarietyrecaps.com/society-game-recap-episode-4/
 http://www.koreanvarietyrecaps.com/society-game-recap-episode-5/
 http://www.koreanvarietyrecaps.com/society-game-recap-episode-6/
 http://www.koreanvarietyrecaps.com/society-game-recap-episode-7/
 http://www.koreanvarietyrecaps.com/society-game-recap-episode-8/
 http://www.koreanvarietyrecaps.com/society-game-recap-episode-9/
 http://www.koreanvarietyrecaps.com/society-game-recap-episode-10/
 http://www.koreanvarietyrecaps.com/society-game-recap-episode-11/
 http://www.koreanvarietyrecaps.com/society-game-recap-episode-12/

South Korean game shows
South Korean reality television series
Television series by Endemol
TVN (South Korean TV channel) original programming